Leeds Central railway station was a terminus railway station in Leeds, West Yorkshire, England. It was opened in 1854 as a joint station between the London and North Western Railway, the Lancashire and Yorkshire Railway, the Great Northern Railway and the North Eastern Railway. It replaced the cramped LNW terminus at Wellington Street, which had opened in 1848 with the line to Dewsbury. It closed in 1967, when its services were moved to Leeds City to consolidate all of Leeds train services in one station.

The station was not architecturally distinguished and was built above street level. A goods lift and a viaduct that approached the station remain extant.

The last train left from Leeds Central on 29 April 1967. This was a Saturday and as there was no Sunday service, the station closed on 1 May 1967. The last train was an early evening service to Harrogate filled by the usual Birmingham RC&W DMU. Detonators were placed on the track by railway staff which exploded as the train rolled away from the platform and past the signal box on its final departure.

Further reading

References 

Disused railway stations in Leeds
Former Great Northern Railway stations
Former Lancashire and Yorkshire Railway stations
Former London and North Western Railway stations
Former North Eastern Railway (UK) stations
Railway stations in Great Britain opened in 1854
Railway stations in Great Britain closed in 1967